Boaz Yakin (born June 20, 1966) is an Israeli-American screenwriter, film director, and producer based in New York City. He has written screenplays to films like The Rookie, Fresh, A Price Above Rubies, Prince of Persia: The Sands of Time, and Now You See Me, and has directed the 2000 sports drama Remember the Titans and the 2012 Jason Statham action film Safe. As a producer he has collaborated frequently with filmmaker Eli Roth and served as executive producer for the first two entries in the Hostel franchise.

Early life
Yakin was born in New York City. Both his parents are Israeli-born, and met in Paris while studying mime with Marcel Marceau. His father's family are of Sephardic Jewish (Syrian-Jewish and Egyptian-Jewish) descent, and his mother's family is of Ashkenazi Jewish (Polish-Jewish) descent.

He attended the Bronx High School of Science, where he was classmates in 1983 with actor Jon Cryer. He studied filmmaking at City College of New York then at New York University and made his first deal for a screenplay at age 19.

Career
After finishing school, Yakin worked in the film industry, developing projects for several companies, and saw his first screenplay reach the screen in 1989, when The Punisher, a vehicle for Dolph Lundgren, was released. Yakin's next screenplay was The Rookie, starring Clint Eastwood and Charlie Sheen. Wanting to take on more personal material, Yakin drew from his experiences growing up in New York's inner city for his next screenplay, Fresh. Yakin opted to direct his screenplay for Fresh himself. The film won critical acclaim, earning the Filmmaker's Trophy at the 1994 Sundance Film Festival.

Yakin went back to his youth for inspiration on his next project. His experience with the Chassidic community informed his screenplay for A Price Above Rubies. Yakin rebounded with his next assignment, which was his first film that he directed but did not write; Remember the Titans was a major box office success, and moved him to the upper tier of bankable Hollywood talents.

His Holocaust drama Death in Love debuted in January 2008. Yakin describes it as a movie about the failure of the family and inability to change your past.

He was a member of the US Dramatic Jury at the 2009 Sundance Film Festival.

In 2010, it was announced that Yakin would direct Sympathy for the Devil, with Samuel L. Jackson and Josh Duhamel in the cast. The project was still in development as of 2014.

Yakin's family film Max was released by Warner Bros. and MGM on June 26, 2015.

His 2020 film, Aviva, was set to premiere at the SXSW Film Festival, but was released publicly because of the COVID-19 pandemic.

Personal life
Yakin was married to Israeli music video director Alma Har'el. The couple divorced in 2012.

Filmography

Producer only
 2001 Maniacs (2001)
 Bombay Beach (2011) (Documentary)

Executive producer only
 Hostel (2005)
 Hostel: Part II (2007)

Books
Marathon, a graphic novel illustrated by Joe Infurnari, First Second, 2012
Jerusalem, a graphic novel illustrated by Nick Bertozzi, First Second, 2013

References

External links
All-Movie Guide entry for Boaz Yakin

About Boaz Yakin

1966 births
American male screenwriters
American Sephardic Jews
Living people
Tisch School of the Arts alumni
Writers from New York City
Jewish American screenwriters
American people of Israeli descent
American people of Egyptian-Jewish descent
American people of Polish-Jewish descent
American people of Syrian-Jewish descent
City College of New York alumni
Film directors from New York City
Screenwriters from New York (state)
Israeli Ashkenazi Jews
Israeli Sephardi Jews
Israeli Mizrahi Jews
The Bronx High School of Science alumni
Jewish film people